Cathedral of Saint Vincent is a Roman Catholic church, and former cathedral in Roda de Isábena.

See also
Catholic Church in Spain

References

Roman Catholic cathedrals in Aragon
Roda de Isábena